Nabil Mazari (born February 18, 1984 in Tizi Ouzou) is an Algerian football player. He currently plays as a goalkeeper for JS Kabylie in the Algerian league.

Club career
 2003-pres. JS Kabylie

Honours
 Won the Algerian League three times with JS Kabylie in 2004, 2006 and 2008

External links
 JS Kabylie Profile
 DZFoot Profile

    
    

1984 births
Living people
Footballers from Tizi Ouzou
Kabyle people
Algerian footballers
JS Kabylie players
Algeria under-23 international footballers
Algerian Ligue Professionnelle 1 players
Association football goalkeepers
21st-century Algerian people